Azinsky is a rural locality (a settlement) in Chernushinsky District, Perm Krai, Russia. The population was 1,492 as of 2010. There are 35 streets.

Geography 
Azinsky is located 2 km northwest of Chernushka (the district's administrative centre) by road. Chernushka is the nearest rural locality.

References 

Rural localities in Chernushinsky District